Fuchsia steyermarkii is a species of plant in the family Onagraceae. It is endemic to Ecuador.

References

Flora of Ecuador
steyermarkii
Vulnerable plants
Taxonomy articles created by Polbot